Johann "Hannes" Schnier (born March 23, 1977 in Vienna) is an Austrian darts player who plays in Professional Darts Corporation events.

Career
In June 2006, Schnier won the Austrian National Championship, beating Dietmar Burger in the final. Since 2007, Schnier has played in tournaments sanctioned by the German Darts Corporation, an affiliate of the PDC where its highest ranked player earns automatic qualification for the PDC World Darts Championship. He has made numerous quarter final and semi final appearances but has so far only managed to win one GDC ranked event in Niedernhausen in May 2008.

Schnier made his televised debut in the inaugural European Darts Championship in Frankfurt, Germany where he lost in the first round to Adrian Lewis.

Schnier finished 2nd in the GDC rankings in 2008 and as the top GDC player Mensur Suljović qualified as one of the four top ranked Europeans on the PDC Order of Merit, Schnier earned qualification for the 2009 PDC World Darts Championship but lost to China's Shi Yongsheng 6-4 in the preliminary round.

Schnier signed a sponsorship deal with UK darts manufacturers Showtime Darts in 2016.

World Championship results

PDC
 2009: Last 70 (lost to Shi Yongsheng 4-6) (legs)

External links
Profile and stats on Darts Database

1977 births
Austrian darts players
Living people
British Darts Organisation players
Professional Darts Corporation associate players
Game players from Vienna